Mohr Partners, Inc. is an American global corporate real estate advisory firm based in Dallas, Texas.

History
Bob Mohr founded Mohr Partners in 1986, just two years after moving his family to Dallas from Indiana. Starting with an office in Dallas, Mohr Partners eventually grew to over 25 offices by 2020. In 2014, Robert Shibuya joined Mohr Partners as the company's president, and helped expand the firm to offices in multiple locations including Nashville, Phoenix, St. Louis, and Austin.

In 2017, Shibuya completed a management buyout of Mohr Partners, assuming the role of chairman and CEO.  Mohr was named chairman emeritus. Mohr Partners continued to expand both its international footprint and its commitment to diversity. Currently, Mohr Partners maintains 23 offices in the United States and four international offices.

The firm is recognized as a National Corporate Plus Member by the National Minority Supplier Development Council (NMSDC). Mohr Partners is the only commercial real estate firm in the program.

Services
Mohr Partners uses:
 Strategic consulting and advice
 Mohr Intel (business intelligence)
 Global lease services
 Research and site selection
 Incentives practice
 Transaction management
 Project and development services
 Capital markets

References

External links
 

Companies based in Dallas